Melvin Morse may refer to:

 Melvin L. Morse, pediatrician and author on near death experiences
 M. Laurance Morse (1921–2003), American microbiologist